Himmeleck is a mountain of Bavaria, Germany.

Mountains of Bavaria
Mountains of the Alps
Two-thousanders of Germany